John or Jack Ross may refer to:

Entertainment
 John Ross (author) (born 1957), American author of the 1996 novel Unintended Consequences
 John F. Ross (author), American historian and author
 John Ross (publisher), printer and publisher in 19th century Newcastle
 John Ross (artist) (fl. 1996), British comic book artist
 Jack Ross (musician) (1916–1982), rock and roll singles in 1962
 Jack Ross (writer) (born 1962), New Zealand poet and novelist
 John Ross Ewing III, character in the TV series Dallas
 John A. Ross (composer) (1940–2006), African American jazz musician, composer and choral conductor

Law
 John Ross of the Inner Temple (1563–1607), English barrister and poet
 John Wesley Ross (1841–1902), American attorney in Washington, D.C.
 Sir John Ross, 1st Baronet (1853–1935), Irish judge and Unionist politician
 John Rolly Ross (1899–1963), U.S. federal judge
 John William Ross (1878–1925), U.S. federal judge
 John Wilson Ross (1863–1945), Justice of the Supreme Court of Arizona
 John Andrew Ross (born 1954), Missouri judge

Military
 John Ross (American patriot) (1726–1800), figure in the American Revolution
 John Lockhart-Ross (1721–1790), admiral of the British Royal Navy
 John Ross (1744–1809), British Army officer
 John Ross (Royal Navy officer) (1777–1856), British naval officer and Polar explorer
 John E. Ross (1818–1890), fought in the Modoc War
 John Ross (VC) (1822–1879), Scottish corporal of the British Army during the Crimean War
 John Ross (British Army officer, born 1829) (1829–1905), British commander
 John Ross (British Army officer, died 1843), Lieutenant Governor of Guernsey
 John Buchan Ross (1912–2009), British Royal Air Force officer
 Jack Ross (Australian soldier) (John Campbell Ross, 1899–2009), Australian veteran of the First World War
 John H. Ross (1918–2013), pilot during World War II

Politics
 John Ross (representative) (1770–1834), U.S. Representative from Pennsylvania
 John Ross (Cherokee chief) (1790–1866), Principal Chief of the Cherokee Nation
 John Ross (Canadian politician) (1818–1871), Canadian Senator from Ontario
 John Sylvester Ross (1821–1882), miller and political figure in Ontario
 John Ross (Nova Scotia politician) (1822–1892), political figure in Nova Scotia, Canada
 John Jones Ross (1831–1901), Canadian politician from Quebec
 J. Gordon Ross (1891–1972), Liberal party member of the Canadian House of Commons
 John Ross (New South Wales politician) (1891–1973), member of the New South Wales Legislative Assembly
 J. R. Campbell (communist) (1894–1969), British communist activist and newspaper editor
 John N. Ross (1920–2011), Irish solicitor and politician
 John Ross (activist) (1938–2011), American author, journalist, and activist
 John Ross (Victorian politician) (1940–2003), member of the Victorian Legislative Council
 Jack Ross (Arizona politician) (1927–2013), Arizona car dealer, philanthropist and politician
 John Q. Ross (1873–1922), Lieutenant Governor of Michigan

Religion
 John Ross (bishop of Carlisle) (died 1332), English bishop of Carlisle
 John Ross (bishop of Exeter) (1719–1792), English bishop of Exeter
 John Ross (missionary) (1842–1915), Scottish missionary to Northeast China

Sports
 John Ross (American football) (born 1995), American football player
 John Ross (wrestler and neighbor) (born 1982), Wrestler, Entertainer, and Appliance enthusiast for Imagine Wrestling 
 John Ross (curler) (born 1938), Canadian curler
 Jack Ross (footballer, born 1892) (1892–1973), Australian rules footballer for Geelong between 1920 and 1922
 Jack Ross (footballer, born 1895) (1895–1943), Australian rules footballer for Geelong in 1919
 Jack Ross (footballer, born 1911) (1911–1996), Australian rules footballer for Collingwood
 Jack Ross (footballer, born 2000), Australian rules footballer for Richmond
 Jack Ross (footballer, born 1976), Scottish professional footballer

 John Ross (rower) (1945–2009), Canadian rower in the 1968 Summer Olympics
 John Ross (rugby union) (born 1967), Australian rugby player
 John Ross (runner) (1931–2022), Canadian Olympic athlete
 John Ross (tennis) (born 1964), professional tennis player

Other
 John Ross, 1st Lord Ross (died 1501), Scottish nobleman
 John Ross, 2nd Lord Ross (died 1513), Scottish nobleman
 John Ross (explorer) (1817–1903), explorer of Central Australia
 Charles Rawden Maclean (1815–1880), known as John Ross, sea captain and opponent of slavery
 John W. Ross (Iowa architect) (1830–1914), architect in Davenport, Iowa
 John W. Ross (North Dakota architect) (1848–1914), architect in Grand Forks, North Dakota
 John Ross (businessman) (1840–1876), Scottish retail businessman
 J. K. L. Ross (1876–1951), Canadian industrialist from Montreal
 John Ross (chemist) (1926–2017), American physical chemist
 John R. Ross (born 1938), American linguist
 John Ross (blogger) (fl. 1980s), British far-left blogger
 John Merry Ross (1833–1883), Scottish academic author and teacher

See also
 John Ross House (disambiguation)
 S. John Ross (disambiguation)